The 2005 Chinese Super League season was the second season of China's top-tier football competition. With no relegation the previous season, the league expanded from 12 to 14 clubs with the promotion of Shanghai Zobon and Wuhan Huanghelou. The season was scheduled to start on 5 March 2005, but was postponed until April due to a sponsorship problem and finished on 5 November with Dalian Shide, seven-time champions in the old first division, clinching their eighth title. Defending champions Shenzhen Jianlibao finished third from bottom, the second consecutive year in which the defending champions has done so.

The FA had announced at the start of the season that no teams would be relegated for this season and they kept to this decision.

Promotion and relegation
Teams promoted from 2004 China League One
Wuhan Huanghelou
Shanghai Zobon

Teams relegated after end of 2004 Chinese Super League
None

The season
The two-year-old league provided a more positive side of football than the previous season, with much fewer drug-abusing, match-fixing and other scandals on and off the pitch. However, the season was criticised for being unexciting with some stating that the only reason that particular clubs did well was because of foreign talent.

Most teams had not invested enough into their squads for the season to compete for the top positions in the CSL. As the decision to cancel relegation had been announced before the start of the season, unlike the previous season where it was decided halfway through. Teams with no chance of winning the league were thus reluctant to spend money in the transfer market.

Nevertheless, there was still strong competition at the top of the table with six teams fighting for the top two AFC Champions League spots. Dalian Shide remained at the top for almost the whole length of the season but there was a constant rotation of second place.

At the lower half of the table, Chongqing Lifan finished at the bottom of the table for two years running while Shenyang Ginde deteriorated to second from bottom.

Early surprises
Among the contenders for the second spot, Wuhan Huanghelou was no doubt the surprise package. The team, promoted to the CSL the previous season, was little known to their opponents; but they started superbly, embarking on a seven match winning streak at one point, which put them hot on the heels of Dalian Shide. However, like many inexperienced sides, their composure failed in the second half of the season but they still finished a remarkable fifth.

Late dash
In the second half of the season, the battle for second was mainly between Shanghai Shenhua and Tianjin Teda. The gap between the two clubs was tiny and neither could afford slip-ups, although Shandong Luneng Taishan and Beijing Hyundai, who were also within striking distance, were eyeing their opponents' performances closely.

Shanghai Shenhua had a late surge of form to secure second with Shandong Luneng Taishan finished third to miss the final Champions League spot by just one point while Tianjin Teda was happy enough with a fourth place.

Dalian Shide won their eighth top-tier title with a 12 points cushion although they and Shanghai Shenhua had lost the same number of games because they had managed to win 6 games more.

League table

Top scorers

Attendances

League
Total attendance: 1,871,700 
Average attendance: 10,284

Clubs

See also
Chinese Super League
Football in China
Chinese Football Association
Chinese Football Association Jia League
Chinese Football Association Yi League
Chinese FA Cup

References

External links
 Results and table on RSSSF 
 2005 Chinese Super League on Sina 

Chinese Super League seasons
1
China
China